There are two places in New Zealand called Kelvin Grove:
Kelvin Grove, Manawatu-Wanganui, a suburb of Palmerston North
Kelvin Grove, Otago, near Queenstown